Mumper may refer to:

 Larry Mumper (born 1937), American politician
 Mumper, Nebraska, unincorporated community